Blindpassasjer (Norwegian: Stowaway, literally "blind passenger"; English title: Marco Polo) was a Norwegian science fiction television series from 1978. It aired 3 episodes.

In the show, a spaceship has 5 crew members. A biological robot, or 'Biomat', kills one of the crew members and replaces him, but the identity of the victim is unknown.

Blindpassasjer is noteworthy for being the first science fiction series to air on Norwegian television. It has a plot similar to Ridley Scott's film 'Alien' that came to cinemas in 1979.

References

External links

 Review at Nordic Fantasy

1970s science fiction television series
Norwegian television series